Youngblood is a 1978 American film directed by Noel Nosseck. It stars Lawrence Hilton-Jacobs and features Bryan O'Dell in the title role.  Ren Woods has a prominent supporting role. It was released by American International Pictures. The soundtrack to the film was written and performed by War.

Plot
Michael (O'Dell) is an African-American teenager in South-Central Los Angeles, being raised by a single mother and beginning to drift away from school.  Before long, Michael is running with a tough local street gang, the Kingsmen, who christen him with the nickname "Youngblood".  Michael greatly looks up to the gang's leader, Rommel (Hilton-Jacobs), an angry Vietnam War veteran who is beginning to accept the fact that he's getting to be too old to be involved in the street gang lifestyle.

Shortly after Michael joins the Kingsmen, they move from merely battling other similar street gangs to becoming involved in a full-scale war against a local cartel of drug dealers.  And, unknown to Michael and the Kingsmen, the head of the organization is Michael's own older brother.

Soundtrack

Track listing:
 "Youngblood (Livin' In The Streets)"
 "Sing A Happy Song"
 "Keep On Doin'"
 "The Kingsmen Sign"
 "Walking To War"
 "This Funky Music Makes You Feel Good"
 "Junk Yard"
 "Superdude"
 "Youngblood & Sybil"
 "Flyin' Machine (The Chase)"
 "Searching For Youngblood & Rommel"
 "Youngblood (Livin' In The Streets) Reprise"

See also
 List of blaxploitation films
 List of hood films

References

External links
 

African-American action films
American International Pictures films
1978 films
1978 action films
1970s English-language films
Films directed by Noel Nosseck
1970s American films